The men's decathlon at the 2012 World Junior Championships in Athletics was held at the Estadi Olímpic Lluís Companys on 10 and 11 July.

Medalists

Records

Results

100 metres

Long jump

Shot put

High jump

400 metres

110 metres hurdles

Discus throw

Pole vault

Javelin throw

1500 metres

Standings

Participation
According to an unofficial count, 23 athletes from 16 countries participated in the event.

References

External links
WJC12 decathlon schedule

Decathlon
Combined events at the World Athletics U20 Championships